A list of films produced in France in 1973.

See also
1973 in France
1973 in French television

Footnotes

References

External links
 French films of 1973 at the Internet Movie Database
French films of 1973 at Cinema-francais.fr

1973
Films
French